45 Minutes From Hollywood (1926) is an American two-reel silent film released by Pathé Exchange. The runtime is 15 minutes.

At the time, it was known as a Glenn Tryon vehicle, but today it is best remembered as the second instance of Stan Laurel and Oliver Hardy appearing in the same film together — although they do not share any scenes — at least half a decade after their first chance billing in The Lucky Dog (1921).

Since the film uses footage from the Theda Bara star vehicle Madame Mystery (released April 1926), it is also the last screen appearance of silent film vamp Bara.

Plot 
A California family is sent a letter informing them that if they do not quickly travel to Hollywood to pay a fee they owe, they will be evicted from their home. The family decides to send Grandpa, but the son so badly wants to see Hollywood that he convinces his mother to let him go, too.

Description 
Stan appears in bed in his only scene. He wears a nightcap, nightgown, and a large comedy mustache. Jimmy Finlayson appears looking like this in several later Laurel and Hardy films. Oliver also features a similar mustache. Laurel's name does not appear in the credits for this film, but Hardy's name does.

Cast

Glenn Tryon
Rube Clifford
Molly O'Day 
Theda Bara 
Mickey Daniels 
Scooter Lowry
Allen "Farina" Hoskins 
Jackie Condon 
Jay R. Smith
Johnny Downs 
Joe Cobb 
Oliver Hardy 
Edna Murphy 
Jerry Mandy 
Ham Kinsey
Ed Brandenburg 
Jack Hill 
Stan Laurel 
Al Hallett
Tiny Sandford 
Monte Collins
The Hal Roach Bathing Beauties
Janet Gaynor

References

External links 
 
 45 Minutes From Hollywood at SilentEra

1926 films
1926 comedy films
1926 short films
Silent American comedy films
American silent short films
American black-and-white films
Films directed by Fred Guiol
Films with screenplays by H. M. Walker
American comedy short films
1920s American films